The following highways are numbered 9B:

United States
 Florida State Road 9B
 Maine State Route 9B
 Nebraska Recreation Road 9B
 New York State Route 9B